Paralycaeides is a Neotropical genus of butterfly in the family Lycaenidae.

Species
Paralycaeides inconspicua (Draudt, 1921)  Central and South Peru (high Andes)
Paralycaeides shade Bálint, 1993  Central Peru (high Andes)
Paralycaeides vapa (Staudinger, 1894)  South Peru, Bolivia, Northeast Chile, Argentina, North Patagonia (high Andes)

References

External links
Images of Paralycaeides at Butterflies of the Americas

Polyommatini
Lycaenidae of South America
Lycaenidae genera